Rodolfo Amoedo (11 December 1857 – 31 May 1941) was a Brazilian painter, designer and decorator.

Biography
His interest in art and decoration began when a family friend (who was a lyricist) invited him to do work on the now defunct Teatro São Pedro. In 1873, he enrolled at the "", where he studied with Victor Meirelles. The following year, he transferred to the Academia Imperial de Belas Artes. His teachers there included João Zeferino da Costa, Agostinho José da Mota and the sculptor Francisco Manuel Chaves Pinheiro. In 1878, his painting on the "Sacrifice of Abel" narrowly won him a travel fellowship to study in Europe. 

From 1879 to 1887, he lived and studied in Paris. Initially, he attended the Académie Julian, but finally managed to enroll at the École des Beaux-arts in 1880, where he received the guidance of Alexandre Cabanel, Paul Baudry and Puvis de Chavannes. From 1882 to 1884, he participated in the Salon while developing his primary themes of mythology, Biblical scenarios and Indianismo.

On his return to Rio de Janeiro in 1888, he was appointed an Honorary Professor as the Academia, but actually taught at the Escola Politécnica and held his first personal exhibition. He won a gold medal at the "Exposição Nacional Comemorativa do 1º Centenário da Abertura dos Portos do Brasil" (1908).

He later became a Professor at the Escola Nacional de Belas Artes (ENBA), where he encouraged students to research the various process of painting (tempera, encaustic, watercolor etc.). He also served as Vice-Director and Acting Director on several occasions.

In addition to his canvases, he painted panels for the Supremo Tribunal Federal in 1909, the Biblioteca Nacional and the Theatro Municipal do Rio de Janeiro in 1916. Two years later, he was awarded the Second Chair in the School of Painting, a position he held until 1934. Among his best-known students were the brothers Arthur and João Timóteo da Costa, Lucílio de Albuquerque, Eliseu Visconti and Cândido Portinari.

Selected paintings

References

Further reading
C. Calza et al.: Analysis of paintings from the 19th century Brazilian painter Rodolfo Amoedo using EDXRF portable system. In: X-Ray Spectrometry. No. 38 (2009), Vol.4, ISSN 0049-8246

External links

1857 births
1941 deaths
People from Salvador, Bahia
Academic art
École des Beaux-Arts alumni
Académie Julian alumni
19th-century Brazilian painters
19th-century Brazilian male artists
20th-century Brazilian painters
20th-century Brazilian male artists